Zakaria Bakkali (born 26 January 1996) is a Belgian professional footballer who plays as a winger for Eredivisie club RKC Waalwijk.

He is most famous for becoming the youngest Eredivisie player of all-time to score a hat-trick, at the age of 16 years and 133 days.

Club career

PSV
Born in Liège to immigrant parents from Morocco, after starting his footballing career at the youth academies of RFC Liège and later Standard Liège, Bakkali transferred to PSV Eindhoven of the Netherlands at the age of 12.

On 30 July 2013, Bakkali made his debut for PSV against Zulte Waregem in a UEFA Champions League qualifying match. He made his Eredivisie debut against ADO Den Haag in the opening game of the season on 3 August. On 7 August, he scored his first senior goal in the second-leg of the Champions League tie against Zulte in a 3–0 win. On 10 August, he scored a hat-trick in PSV's 5–0 victory over NEC Nijmegen at the Philips Stadion, becoming the youngest player to score a hat-trick in Eredivisie history.

In the middle of 2014, Bakkali was set for a move to Atlético Madrid for a fee of around €2-3 million, but the move fell through. After rejecting a new contract from PSV, Bakkali was banished from the first-team, with PSV agreeing to sell him in the winter transfer window. Scottish club Celtic offered £750,000 on transfer deadline day for Bakkali, but a PSV spokesman stated that "this deadline day no deal will be closed by PSV with any team for this particular player".

Valencia
On 6 July 2015, Bakkali moved to La Liga club Valencia CF, after agreeing to a five-year deal. He made his unofficial debut against Werder Bremen on 11 July. He scored his first goal for Valencia on 31 October in a 3–0 home win over local rivals Levante. On 14 July 2017, he was loaned to fellow league team Deportivo de La Coruña for one year.

Anderlecht
On 4 July 2018, Bakkali returned to Belgium to sign with R.S.C. Anderlecht.

Loan to Beerschot 
On 1 February 2021, Bakkali moved to Belgium club Beerschot, on a loan deal until the end of the season. The deal included a purchase option.

RKC Waalwijk
Bakkali joined Eredivisie club RKC Waalwijk on 3 August 2022, signing a two-year contract.

International career
After his breakthrough into the PSV first team, Belgium senior coach Marc Wilmots selected him in his 25-man squad for the friendly match against France. Due to a training injury sustained the day before the game, he was pulled out of the squad. With his dual nationality and without full international appearances, he still had the choice to play for the Morocco national football team, but on 7 October 2013 (shortly before Belgium's last two 2014 FIFA World Cup qualifiers) he formally opted for the Red Devils. He was recalled to the Belgium squad in October 2015 for Euro 2016 qualifiers against Andorra and Israel.

Career statistics

Club

International

References

External links

 
 Zakaria Bakkali at Voetbal International  – 
 
 

1996 births
Living people
Footballers from Liège
Belgian footballers
Belgian people of Riffian descent
Belgian people of Moroccan-Berber descent
Association football wingers
Eredivisie players
Eerste Divisie players
La Liga players
Belgian Pro League players
PSV Eindhoven players
Valencia CF players
Deportivo de La Coruña players
R.S.C. Anderlecht players
K Beerschot VA players
RKC Waalwijk players
Belgium youth international footballers
Belgium under-21 international footballers
Belgium international footballers
Belgian expatriate footballers
Belgian expatriate sportspeople in the Netherlands
Expatriate footballers in the Netherlands
Belgian expatriate sportspeople in Spain
Expatriate footballers in Spain